"Lost" (stylized in all caps) is a song by American rapper NF featuring fellow American rapper Hopsin, released on March 11, 2021 as the third single from the former's mixtape Clouds (The Mixtape). The song was written by NF, Tommee Profitt, Saint X, and Hopsin, while being produced by the former three. In the song, NF raps about feeling lost and finding himself. It is also Hopsin's first entry on the Billboard Hot 100 chart.

Background
NF first teased his collaboration with Hopsin in July 2020 with a photo of them in a snowy landscape.

Music video
The music video was released on March 11, 2021 and directed by NF and Patrick Tohill. It was filmed in the Colorado mountains and finds NF with a number of balloons tied to him, as he and Hopsin wander through the snowy mountains to find their way.

Charts

References

2021 singles
2021 songs
NF (rapper) songs
Hopsin songs
Songs written by NF (rapper)
Songs written by Hopsin
Songs written by Tommee Profitt